Encoder may refer to:

Electronic circuits
 Audio encoder, converts digital audio to analog audio signals
 Video encoder, converts digital video to analog video signals
 Simple encoder, assigns a binary code to an active input line
 Priority encoder, outputs a binary code representing the highest-priority active input
 8b/10b encoder, creates DC balance on a communication transmission line

Media compression
 Compressor, encodes data (e.g., audio/video/images) into a smaller form (see codec)

Sensors 
 Encoder (position)
 Rotary encoder, converts rotary position to electronic signals
 Linear encoder, converts linear position to electronic signals
 Absolute encoder, outputs the absolute position
 Incremental encoder, converts position changes to electronic signals in real time
 Altitude encoder

See also
 Decoder (disambiguation)
 Encode (disambiguation)